Nissim Barda is a former Israeli footballer.

References

1956 births
Living people
Israeli Jews
Israeli footballers
Israel international footballers
Footballers from Ramat Gan
Maccabi Ramat Amidar F.C. players
Maccabi Petah Tikva F.C. players
Maccabi Netanya F.C. players
Shimshon Tel Aviv F.C. players
Liga Leumit players
Association football defenders